Ulaş Güler (born April 8, 1980 in Aydin, Turkey), is a Turkish footballer. He currently plays for Aydinspor.

External links
Guardian Stats Centre

1980 births
Living people
Turkish footballers
Association football goalkeepers
Hacettepe S.K. footballers
Giresunspor footballers
People from Aydın